The Institute for Advanced International Studies (in French Institut québécois des hautes études internationales),  now known as the School of Advanced International Studies is a part of Université Laval.

The school conducts research on an teaches international studies with an interdisciplinary focus.

The School Team
 Pierre S. Pettigrew Pierre Pettigrew (President)
 Louis Bélanger (Director)
 About 80 scientific researchers specialized in the fields of International security, sustainable development, European integration, the Americas, international trade,

Teaching activities
The School offers a master's in international studies and the doctorate in international studies. These programs are interdisciplinary ones : law, economics, management and political science.

Research activities
The members work about international issues through several research groups:
 Centre d'études interaméricaines (CEI)  
 Programme Paix et sécurité internationales (PSI)  
 Cercle Europe  
 Groupe d'études et de recherches sur l'Asie contemporaine (GERAC)  
 Chaire de recherche du Canada sur les conflits identitaires et le terrorisme  
 Chaire de recherche du Canada en droit de l'environnement  
 Chaire de recherche du Canada sur les normes de gestion du développement durable  
 Chaire d'études maghrébines

Knowledge dissemination activities
 The peer reviewed journal, Études internationales  , founded in 1970, is dedicated to the study of international phenomena.
 The School organizes about 60 conferences, symposiums and round tables each year.

References

External links
  Official site of the School of Advanced International Studies

Université Laval
Canadian educational programs